Medonte, re di Epiro ("Medonte, King of Epirus") is an opera seria in three acts by Giuseppe Sarti. The libretto was by Giovanni de Gamerra for Felice Alessandri's opera Medonte, re d'Epiro (1774) and was later set by several other composers.

Performance history

It was first performed at the Teatro della Pergola in Florence on 8 September 1777. The opera was very successful in its time.

Roles

References

Further reading
Medonte, re di Epiro by Marita P. McClymonds, in The New Grove Dictionary of Opera, ed. Stanley Sadie (London, 1992)

External links
 

Operas
Italian-language operas
Opera seria
Operas by Giuseppe Sarti
1777 operas
Operas set in antiquity